The Beyond may refer to:

Film 
 The Beyond (1981 film), a 1981 Italian horror film
 The Beyond (2018 film), a 2018 science-fiction film

Music 
 The Beyond (album), an album by Cult of Luna
 The Beyond (band), a UK progressive metal band
 "The Beyond" (song), a 2020 single by Luna Sea

Literature 
 A fictional region of space in the Demon Princes novels by Jack Vance
 A fictional "Zone of Thought" in the novel A Fire Upon the Deep by Vernor Vinge, and its prequel, A Deepness in the Sky

See also 
 Beyond (disambiguation)